The Jamestown Jets were an American junior ice hockey team based in Jamestown, New York. Originally members of the United Junior Hockey League and later the Northern Junior Hockey League. The Jets played in the Canadian Greater Metro Junior A Hockey League in 2010-11.

History
The team was announced in March 2008. The team's name comes from the Winnipeg Jets and was chosen by a fan.

The franchise was founded by majority owner Barry Soskin and Dennis Canfield in March 2008 and the team logo and name was released on April 22, 2008 at a press conference at the JSBIA.  

In August 2010, the Jets join a Canadian league Canadian Greater Metro Junior A Hockey League in Ontario.  On September 17, 2010, the Jets played their first GMHL game, at home, winning 4-3 over fellow expansion club Sturgeon Falls Lumberjacks.  The game was the first international regulation game in the GMHL's history.

On April 30, 2011, the Jamestown Savings Bank Ice Arena moved to evict the Jets, claiming that the team's lease was with the previous owner and was no longer valid due to the team's sale. Less than three weeks later, the GMHL announced that the Jets would be leaving the GMHL as part of the lease issues with the Arena. The establishment of the Jamestown Ironmen, which is also a Junior A franchise but one based in the U.S.-based North American Hockey League, put the Jets' future in doubt and was a direct cause of the lawsuit as the Jets held an "exclusive" lease.  The team continues operations and is currently dormant as the lawsuit is active. At one time, Canfield had proposed renovation of the smaller Allen Park Ice Rink which was not cost effective. http://post-journal.com/page/content.detail/id/617920/Struggle-To-Survive.html. As of April 2013 the lawsuit Canfield filed against the Ironmen, Arena, and NAHL has progressed to New York State Supreme Court and is currently in the discovery phase sitting in the judges chambers. The Ironmen have since suspended operations.

Regular season records

Notable alumni
Alexander Galaysha

References

External links
Official Web site

Sports in Jamestown, New York
Ice hockey teams in New York (state)